Maria Carolina Casadevall Gonzaga (born 24 July 1987) is a Brazilian actress.

Career 
Casadevall began working as an advertising actress, making her first commercial at age 16. Soon after began to dedicate to the scenic studies of interpretation of TV and cinema with the director Fernando Leal. She has also taken acting courses at the Wolf Maya Academy of Actors.

She began her career in 2009, participating in the plays Roberto Zucco and Hipóteses Para o Amor e a Verdade, staged by the theater company Satyros in São Paulo. Casadevall signs a contract with Rede Globo. She made her television debut in 2011 in the miniseries Lara com Z, and in 2013 she was cast in the cast of Amor à Vida. In 2014, she stars the GNT series Lili, a Ex, adaptated of the homonymous comic strip by Caco Galhardo. In 2015, she plays Margot in the telenovela, I Love Paraisópolis. In 2016, she plays Lili again for Lili, a Ex second season.

In December 2013 she was voted Woman of the Year by the GQ Brasil magazine.

Personal life
She is the second cousin of Céu (a well-known Brazilian singer-songwriter with more than 20 years of career). She is the youngest of the two cousins (Casadevall is 7 years younger than Céu).

Filmography

Television

Film

Theater

References

External links

1987 births
Living people
Actresses from São Paulo
Brazilian people of Spanish descent
Brazilian television actresses
Brazilian film actresses
Brazilian stage actresses
21st-century Brazilian actresses